Qingmeng tuo is a caizi jiaren Chinese novel of the early Qing dynasty.  It was written by Anyang Jiumin (安陽酒民), a writer under a pseudonym, and was written in the late seventeenth-century and published in the early eighteenth-century.

The novel depicts the love story of Hu Chuqing and Shen Ruosu and it is set during the Ming dynasty Chongzhen period. The novel is known for its depictions of various masquerading identities, in which the male protagonist masquerade as a servant to get close to his lover, while the female protagonist also disguises herself as a man.

Citations 

Chinese classic novels
17th-century Chinese novels
Qing dynasty novels